Frederick of Sweden - ; Swedish also: Fredrik - may refer to:

Frederick, King of Sweden 1720
Frederick, Prince of Sweden 1685, son of King Carl XI (died in infancy)
Frederick Adolph, Prince of Sweden 1750
Adolph Frederick, King of Sweden 1751